Rattail Ridge is a ridge located in the Catskill Mountains of New York north-northeast of Delhi. Rattail Ridge is located north of Betts Hill and east of Mount Meredith.

References

Mountains of Delaware County, New York
Mountains of New York (state)